The 1954–55 season was the 53rd in the history of the Western Football League.

The champions for the first time in their history were Dorchester Town, and the winners of Division Two were Yeovil Town Reserves.

Division One
Division One remained at eighteen clubs after two clubs were promoted to replace Clandown and Stonehouse who were relegated to Division Two.

Bristol City Colts, runners-up in Division Two
Bristol Rovers Colts, champions of Division Two

Division Two
Division Two remained at eighteen clubs after Stonehouse Reserves left the league, and Bristol City Colts and Bristol Rovers Colts were promoted to Division One. Three new clubs joined:

Clandown, relegated from Division One.
Stonehouse, relegated from Division One.
Taunton Town

References

1954-55
4